Khonzodakhon Toshkhujaeva (born 3 March 2000) is an Uzbekistani synchronized swimmer. She represented Uzbekistan at the 2017 World Aquatics Championships in Budapest, Hungary and at the 2019 World Aquatics Championships in Gwangju, South Korea.

In 2018, she finished in 5th place in the women's team event at the 2018 Asian Games held in Jakarta, Indonesia.

At the 2019 World Aquatics Championships she finished in 16th place in the preliminary round in the solo technical routine. She finished in 20th place in the preliminary round in the solo free routine.

References 

Living people
2000 births
Place of birth missing (living people)
Uzbekistani synchronized swimmers
Synchronized swimmers at the 2017 World Aquatics Championships
Artistic swimmers at the 2019 World Aquatics Championships
Artistic swimmers at the 2018 Asian Games
Asian Games competitors for Uzbekistan